Bang Dae-du (Hangul: 방대두, Hanja: 方大斗; born October 14, 1954 in Gyeongsan, Gyeongsangbuk-do) is a retired South Korean Greco-Roman wrestler.

He received a bronze medal at the 1984 Summer Olympics in Los Angeles.

References

External links

1954 births
Living people
South Korean wrestlers
Olympic wrestlers of South Korea
Wrestlers at the 1984 Summer Olympics
South Korean male sport wrestlers
Olympic bronze medalists for South Korea
Olympic medalists in wrestling
Asian Games medalists in wrestling
Wrestlers at the 1974 Asian Games
Yong In University alumni
Sportspeople from North Gyeongsang Province
World Wrestling Championships medalists
Medalists at the 1984 Summer Olympics
Universiade medalists in wrestling
Medalists at the 1974 Asian Games
Asian Games bronze medalists for South Korea
Universiade bronze medalists for South Korea
South Korean Buddhists
Medalists at the 1981 Summer Universiade
20th-century South Korean people